Nancy Karaboycheva-Dimitrova (born 1993) is a Bulgarian model who won the title of Miss Bulgaria in 2013. She represented her country at Miss World 2013 which took place in Indonesia in September 2013. Karaboycheva reached the semi-finals and was also placed in the top 10 based on the audience's vote.

Personal life
Karaboycheva graduated from a language high school, but her specialty is informatics and statistics. She is currently enrolled as a student at the UNSS. Karaboycheva is in a long-term relationship with former Bulgarian junior international volleyball player Dobromir Dimitrov. They married on 30 June 2018.

References

External links

Living people
Bulgarian female models
Miss World 2013 delegates
1993 births
Bulgarian beauty pageant winners